Rathaavara is a 2015 Indian Kannada-language action thriller film written and directed by Chandrashekar Bandiyappa and produced by Dharmashree Manjunath. It stars Sri Murali and Rachita Ram in the lead roles. The supporting cast features P. Ravi Shankar, Chikkanna, Sadhu Kokila and Charan Raj among others. The film's music is composed by Dharma Vish, background score by Ravi Basrur and cinematography is by Bhuvan Gowda.

The principal photography of the film began in December 2014 at locations such as Bangalore, Mysore, Mangalore and Gadag. The film release on 4 December 2015 and gained mixed to positive reviews from the critics as well as the audience, but the movie did well at the box office.

Plot
Ratha, a local hitman, works as a right hand to a gangster- cum-MLA Manikanta. Things are going on good with both of them until Manikanta assigns Ratha an easy yet hesitant task to bring a transgender's body due to spiritual beliefs. Ratha tries to capture and kill a transgender Maadevi, but gets trapped in a quest of unluck and curses by Maadevi and always fails at the works assigned to him, thus earning Manikanta's wrath. 
 
Meanwhile, Navami, a simple girl, harbouring ambitions of becoming a photographer, falls in love with Ratha. Though relucant at first, Ratha agrees. Ratha decide to lead a peaceful life, and also donate his one eye to his friend, but Manikanta's henchmen capture Ratha's friends and kills them. Enraged, Ratha finishes Manikanta and his henchmen. However, Maadevi stabs Ratha, who soon dies of his injuries, thus leaving Navami depressed and Maadevi's curse being fulfilled.

Cast
 Sriimurali as Rathavara
 Rachita Ram as Navami
 P. Ravi Shankar as Manikantha
 Saurav Lokesh as Maadevi
 Charan Raj
 Chikkanna
 Sadhu Kokila
 Narendra Babu
 Chitra Shenoy
 Sharath
 Chandru
 Hitesh B.C
 RoopaShree
 Kopplu Puttamma
 Prashanth M
 Dhakshayini
 Triveni
 Chidambaram
 Divya

Production

Development
The first news about the film was announced by actor Sri Murali in his Twitter account in August 2014. Fresh from the success of his previous venture Ugramm (2014), Murali announced that his next venture would be titled as "Rathaavara" and more details of the film would be revealed in the 150th day celebrations of Ugramm. He also released the first look for the film on the social networking site on his birthday. The film was labelled as an action thriller and would be directed by Chandrashekar Bandiyappa.

Casting
After signing Murali for the lead protagonist role, the makers roped in actress Rachita Ram who was busy shooting for Ranna. P. Ravi Shankar was roped in to play the main antagonist role.

Filming
Although the initial reports said the filming to start by October 2014, the actual rolling of the film commenced from December 2014. With the first look of the film out on 17 December 2014, the launch was made a low-key affair with the film's cast and crew members only. The team shot for the film at a brisk pace in and around Mysore. An action sequence was shot at the tourist destination Srirangapatna. Later, it was reported that actor Sri Murali would sing for a track in the film. The climax portions of the film commenced in April 2015 with the actor claiming it to be one of his toughest climaxes shot ever. It was reported that he had to be underwater for close to 12 hours for shooting the climax portions.

Box office

The film ran for 100 days on a few screens in karnataka.

Soundtrack

Dharma Vish has composed the soundtrack and score for the film. The soundtrack album consists of five tracks, out of which one has been sung by actor Sri Murali and penned by Yogaraj Bhat. Other lyricist names featured are Kaviraj, Jayanth Kaikini, V. Nagendra Prasad and K. Kalyan. It was released on 11 November 2015, prior to which the makers sought the blessings of Shivakumara Swami, in Tumkur.

Track listing

References

External links
 
 #rathaavara hashtag on Twitter
 Rathavara is on Track

2015 films
2015 action thriller films
Indian action thriller films
2010s Kannada-language films
Films shot in Bangalore
Films shot in Mangalore
Films shot in Mysore
Films directed by Chandrashekar Bandiyappa